Al-Hashimiya Sport Club, is an Iraqi football team based in Babil, that plays in the Iraq Division Three.

Managerial history
 Hamza Athab
 Fouad Jawad
 Ali Ubayes
 Saleem Tayeh Obaid
 Hassan Hadi
 Ibrahim Hussein 
 Haider Al-Maquraj
 Safaa Rahim

See also
 2021–22 Iraq FA Cup

References

External links
 Al-Hashimiya SC on Goalzz.com
 Iraq Clubs- Foundation Dates

1971 establishments in Iraq
Association football clubs established in 1971
Football clubs in Babil